ARMEDANGELS is a fashion label in Cologne, Germany that sells sustainable fashion products, mainly for a LOHAS demographic. According to the company, they are attempting to change the perception of Eco-friendly clothing from being "hippy like" and not fashionable to it being perceived as 'hip', 'chic' streetwear.  Furthermore, ARMEDANGELS aims to make a social statement about fashion and works exclusively with socially responsible companies that are certified being fair trade.  The main goal of their community is to raise awareness about the fashion industry and what they perceive injustices that arises as a result. The German press has referred to ARMEDANGELS as being "eco warriors in the process of saving the world", who contribute alongside like-minded people including celebrities such as Natalie Portman , Leonardo DiCaprio and Al Gore.

History
The company was founded in January 2007 as Social Fashion Company GmbH by two friends, Anton Jurina and Martin Höfeler. In 2009, the founders won the first ever Wirtschaftswoche Entrepreneur Competition (German language: Gründerwettbewerb der Wirtschaftswoche) for their business model.

In 2020, ARMEDANGELS reported an annual turnover number of € 35 million.

Philosophy
The firm's philosophy is built on three main pillars:
being environmentally friendly,
supporting fair trade,
donating to charity

ARMEDANGELS uses organic cotton and avoids large shipping distances. The company has a strict policy of paying minimum wage to their farmers in India, and donate a euro of their profits from every article of clothing sold. ARMEDANGELS collaborates with three charity organizations: Pratham, Trinkwasserwald, and Viva con Agua. The company used recycled synthetic fibers to produce non-biodegradable products.

Collaborations
ARMEDANGELS partners with several other fashion labels such as: Kuyichi, Terra Plana, Stewart & Brown, Fresh Cuts and KnowledgeCotton Apparel. At the end of 2009, the label began collaborations with German actress Cosma Shiva Hagen, German TV star and VIVA veejay Collien Fernandes. In June 2010 the fashion label teamed up with German Top model Eva Padberg and her husband Niklas Worgt. They designed their own t-shirt "Two Hearts - One Rhythm" which is sold online.

Philanthropy
In 2020, ARMEDANGELS donated approximately € 40,000 to an environmental movement in Germany, Extinction Rebellion.

See also
 Fairtrade
 LOHAS
 Organic cotton
 Sustainable fashion

References

Clothing companies of Germany
German brands
Fair trade organizations
Social enterprises
Manufacturing companies based in Cologne